The 1979–80 Danish 1. division season was the 23rd season of ice hockey in Denmark. Eight teams participated in the league, and Vojens IK won the championship. Hvidovre Ishockey was relegated.

Regular season

External links
Season on eliteprospects.com

Dan
1979 in Danish sport
1980 in Danish sport